Octave Denis Victor Guillonnet (22 September 1872 – 25 September 1967) was a French painter and medallic artist.

His selected works include
 Portrait of his wife Emile in their garden
 A lazy afternoon (n.d.)
 Au jardin (n.d.)
 Le Retour du Troupeau (The Return of the Herd) (n.d.)
 Les Baigneuses, Ce d'Azur (n.d.)
 Garden party (1920)
 Stillife with Yellow Roses and Parrot (1962)

References
 The beautiful story of Joan of Arc : the martyr maid of France / told by Viola Ruth Lowe; pictures by O. D. V. Guillonnet - Lowe, Viola Ruth. Racine, Wis. : Whitman Publishing Co., 1933. 60 pages.

External links
 On Artnet.com
 Medal designed by Guillonet

1872 births
1967 deaths
19th-century French painters
French male painters
20th-century French painters
20th-century French male artists
19th-century French male artists